Guido Alberto Fano (18 May 1875 in Padua – 14 August 1961 at Tauriano di Spilimbergo) was an Italian pianist and composer. From 1894 he was the favoured pupil of Giuseppe Martucci. From 1922 he was professor of piano at the Milan Conservatory. In 1938 he was removed from this position because of the Italian Fascist racial laws and from 1943 to 1945 was in hiding at Fossombrone and Assisi. He returned to teaching 1945–47, then retired.

Works, editions and recordings
 Canzoni. Sara Mingardo. 2011

References

1875 births
1961 deaths
Italian classical composers
Italian male classical composers
Italian classical pianists
Male classical pianists
Italian male pianists
Italian conductors (music)
Italian male conductors (music)
20th-century Italian Jews
Academic staff of Milan Conservatory
Musicians from Padua
Pupils of Giuseppe Martucci
Jewish classical composers